Zombo, Uganda, often referred to simply as Zombo, is a town in Zombo District, West Nile sub-region, Northern Uganda.

Location
The geographical coordinates of the town are: 02°30'47.0"N, 30°54'29.0"E (Latitude:2.513056; Longitude:30.908056).

Population
, the population of Zombo, Uganda was estimated at about 15,000.

Points of interest
The following points of interest lie within the town limits or close to the edges of town: (a) the headquarters of Zombo District Administration, (b) the offices of Zombo Town Council, (c) Zombo Central Market, the largest fresh-produce market in the town and (d) the Zombo Detach of Uganda People's Defence Force (UPDF).

Attack on Zombo UPDF Detach
In the early morning of Friday, 6 March 2020, a gang of civilians, estimated at about 80 people, armed with machetes, spears, knives, bows and arrows, attacked the UPDF detach in Oduk Village in Zombo Municipality. Three UPDF soldiers lost their lives and their rifles (AK-47)s were stolen. A number of the attackers were also killed. In the ensuing melee, a number of grass-thatched buildings were engulfed in fire and destroyed. The surviving bandits retreated towards the nearby international border with the Democratic Republic of the Congo, with the UPDF in pursuit. Later the number of UPDF soldiers killed in the skirmishes was increased upwards to five.

See also

References

External links
 Zombo Residents Ask for Hospital

Populated places in Uganda
Cities in the Great Rift Valley
Zombo District
West Nile sub-region